Do It for Love is the sixteenth studio album by pop music duo Hall & Oates. The album was released on February 11, 2003, by U-Watch Records and Sanctuary Records. The title track peaked at No. 1 on Adult Contemporary charts making it the 8th No. 1 hit of their career, and "Forever For You", "Man on a Mission", and "Getaway Car" all charted as well. It was their first album of all-new material in six years.

"Getaway Car" was also recorded by country acts Susan Ashton, 4 Runner, and The Jenkins, as well as R&B group Dakota Moon. The Jenkins' version was a No. 38 Hot Country Songs hit in 2004.

Track listing

Personnel

Production 
 Producers – Daryl Hall (Tracks #1, 3-14 & 16); John Oates (Track #1); Tom "T-Bone" Wolk (Tracks #1 & 3-14); Brian Rawling (Tracks #1, 4, 7, 11 & 12); Mark Taylor (Tracks #1, 4, 7, 11 & 12); Kenny Gioia and Sheppard Goodman (Tracks #2, 7 & 9); Greg Fitzgerald (Tracks #8, 9 & 10); David Bellochio (Track #13).
 Engineers – Peter Moshay (Tracks #1, 3-14 & 16); Kenny Gioia and Sheppard Goodman  (Track #2).
 Assistant Engineer – Koz Koda
 Mixing – Kenny Gioia and Sheppard Goodman (Tracks #1-4, 6-14); Peter Moshay (Tracks #5 & 16).
 Mastered by Bob Ludwig at Gateway Mastering (Portland, ME).
 Guitar Technician – Chris Davis
 Keyboard Technician – Chris Martirano
 Concept, Design and Digital Imaging – Arthur Burrows
 Photography – Arthur Burrows and Dorothy Low

Charts

References

2003 albums
Hall & Oates albums
Sanctuary Records albums
Albums produced by Brian Rawling